
This is a list of aircraft in alphabetical order beginning with 'S'.

So

Soaring Concepts
(Sturgis, Michigan, United States)
Soaring Concepts Sky Trek

SOBEH
(Stichting voor Ontwikkeling en Bouw van Experimenteel Hefschroefvligtuig)
 SOBEH H-2

SOCATA 
(SOciété de Construction d'Avions de Tourisme et d'Affaires)
 SOCATA ST 10 Diplomate
 SOCATA Rallye
 SOCATA TB-9 Tampico
 SOCATA TB-10 Tobago
 SOCATA TB-11 – Powered by a 134-kW (180-hp) engine.
 SOCATA TB-15 – Proposed version. Not built.
 SOCATA TB-16 – Proposed version. Not built.
 SOCATA TB-20 Trinidad
 SOCATA TB-21 Trinidad
 SOCATA TB-30 Epsilon
 SOCATA TB-60
 SOCATA TB-200 Tobago XL
 SOCATA TB-360 Tangara
 SOCATA TBM-700
 SOCATA TBM-850
 SOCATA TBM-900
 SOCATA Gabier
 SOCATA 110ST Galopin
 SOCATA Garnement
 SOCATA Gaucho
 SOCATA Guerrier
 SOCATA Gulfstream
 SOCATA Horizon

Sochen
(Edwin Sochen)
 Sochen Phoenix

Södertelge
(Södertelge Verkstäde)
 Södertelge Verkstäder SW 15
 Södertelge Verkstäder SW 16

Softex-Aero
 Softex-Aero V-24
 Softex-Aero V-51

Soigneux
(A. Soigneux)
 Soigneux Monocoupe

SOKO
 Soko 522
 Soko G-2 Galeb
 Soko G-3 Galeb
 Soko G-4 Super Galeb
 Soko J-20 Kraguj
 Soko J-21 Jastreb
 Soko J-22 Orao
 Soko S-55

Sokol
 Sokol F-15 Peregrine

Sokopf
(Innsbruck, Austria)
Sokopf Falke

Solar
(Solar Aircraft Co (fdr: Edmund T Price), 1212 Juniper Ave, San Diego, CA)
 Solar MS-1
 Solar MS-2

Solar-Powered Aircraft Developments 
 Solar One

Solar Wings
(a division of P&M Aviation)
Solar Wings Ace
Solar Wings Breeze
Solar Wings Fever
Solar Wings Rumour
Solar Wings Rush
Solar Wings Scandal
Solar Wings Storm
Solar Wings Typhoon
Solar Wings Whisper

Solaris
(Solaris Aviation)
 Solaris Sigma

Soldenhoff
(Alexander Soldenhoff)
 Soldenhoff So.A1
 Soldenhoff So.A2
 Soldenhoff So.A3
 Soldenhoff So.A4
 Soldenhoff So.A5
 Soldenhoff So.S5

Solid Air
(Solid Air UL-Bau Franz GmbH, Rheinland-Pfalz, Germany)
Solid Air Diamant LP
Solid Air Diamant Twin

Solo Wings
(Solo Wings CC, Gillitts, KwaZulu-Natal, South Africa)
Solo Wings Aquilla
Solo Wings Windlass

Soloy 
( Soloy Aviation Solutions)
 Soloy Pathfinder 21

Sol Paragliders
(Jaraguá do Sul, Brazil)
Sol Atmus
Sol Auster
Sol Axion
Sol Balance
Sol Caesar
Sol Classic
Sol Cyclone
Sol Dynamic
Sol Eclipse
Sol Ellus
Sol Flexus
Sol Hercules
Sol Hoops
Sol Impulse
Sol Jumbo
Sol Kangaroo
Sol Koala
Sol Kuat
Sol Lotus
Sol Magic Fun
Sol Neon
Sol Onyx
Sol Pero
Sol Prymus
Sol Quasar
Sol One
Sol Sonic
Sol Faly Stabilis
Sol Start
Sol Super Sonic
Sol Syncross
Sol Synergy
Sol Taxi
Sol Torck
Sol Tornado
Sol TR2
Sol Tracer
Sol Unno
Sol Vello
Sol Yaris
Sol Yess

Solution F 
 Solution F / Chretien electric helicopter

Sombold
 Sombold So 344 Schußjäger

Somers-Kendall
Somers-Kendall SK-1

Somerville 
(William E Somerville, Coal City, IL)
 Somerville 1910 Monoplane
 Somerville 1912 Biplane

Sommer
(Deutsche Sommer-Werke)
 Sommer 1910 biplane
 Sommer Hoch-Tiefs Doppeldecker 1912
 Sommer monoplane

Sonaca
(Sonaca Aircraft)
 Sonaca 200

Sondag-Pavia-Domecq
(Sondag-Pavia-Domecq)
 Sondag-Domecq-Pavia Sopado

Sonex 
 Sonex Aircraft Onex
 Sonex Aircraft Sonex
 Sonex Aircraft Waiex
 Sonex Aircraft Xenos
 Sonex Aircraft SubSonex
 Sonex Aircraft Teros (UAV)

Sonoda 
(Takehiko Sonoda)
 Sonoda 1912 Aeroplane

Sons 
(John A Sons, Humble, TX)
 Sons Trainer

Sopwith 
 Sopwith-Wright biplane
 Sopwith 1½ Strutter
 Sopwith 3-Seater
 Sopwith Admiralty Type 137
 Sopwith Admiralty Type 138
 Sopwith Admiralty Type 806
 Sopwith Admiralty Type 807 Folder Seaplane
 Sopwith Admiralty Type 860
 Sopwith Antelope
 Sopwith Anzani Tractor Seaplane (HT)
 Sopwith AT (Aerial Torpedo)
 Sopwith Atlantic
 Sopwith B.1
 Sopwith Baby
 Sopwith Bat Boat
 Sopwith Bee
 Sopwith Buffalo
 Sopwith Bulldog
 Sopwith Camel
 Sopwith Cobham
 Sopwith Cuckoo
 Sopwith Dragon
 Sopwith Dolphin
 Sopwith Dove
 Sopwith Gnu
 Sopwith Gordon-Bennet racer
 Sopwith Grasshopper
 Sopwith Greek Seaplane
 Sopwith Gun Bus
 Sopwith L.R.T.Tr.
 Sopwith Hippo
 Sopwith Hispano-Suiza Triplane
 Sopwith Hydro Tractor (HT) – also known as "Sopwith Tractor Waterplane"

 Sopwith Pup
 Sopwith Pusher
 Sopwith Rainbow
 Sopwith Rhino
 Sopwith Salamander
 Sopwith Schneider 1913
 Sopwith Schneider 1919
 Sopwith Scooter
 Sopwith SL.T.B.P.
 Sopwith Snail
 Sopwith Snapper
 Sopwith Snark
 Sopwith Snipe
 Sopwith Sparrow
 Sopwith Swallow
 Sopwith Tabloid
 Sopwith Triplane
 Sopwith Two-Seat Scout
 Sopwith Type C (Special torpedo seaplane Type C)
 Sopwith Type D
 Sopwith Wallaby

Sorenson 
(Keith Sorenson, Van Nuys, CA)
 Sorenson Special

Sorrell 
(Otto Sorrell, Rochester, WA)
 Sorrell Bathtub
 Sorrell Colt

Sorrell Aviation 
(Hobart C Sorrell & Sons (John, Mark, Tim), Tenino, Washington, United States )
 Sorrell Biggy Rat
 Sorrell DFG-1
 Sorrell Dr.1
 Sorrell Golden Condor
 Sorrell Intruder
 Sorrell Nieuport 17
 Sorrell SNS-2 Guppy
 Sorrell SNS-4
 Sorrell SNS-6 Hiperbipe
 Sorrell SNS-7 Hiperbipe
 Sorrell SNS-8 Hiperlight
 Sorrell SNS-9 Hiperlight
 Sorrell Hiperlight EXP
 Sorrell EXP II
 Sorrell-Robinson Wenoso
 Sorrell-Robinson Cool Crow

Société Nouvelle d'Aviation Sportive
(Stryke-Air, Noillac, France)
SNAS Stryke-Air Bi
SNAS Stryke-Air Monoplace

Southampton University 
SUMPAC

Southern Aeronautical Corporation
(Southern Aeronautical Corporation, Miami Lakes, Florida, United States)
 Southern Aeronautical Renegade
 Southern Aeronautical Scamp

Southern
(Southern Aircraft Co. / Glenn E. Messer / Messer Aeronautical Industries Inc.)
 Southern Air Boss

Southern 
(Southern Commercial Aircraft Co (founders: Walter & Merle Krouse), Hialeah, FL)
 Southern Sea Hawk

Southern 
(Southern Aircraft Company)
 Southern Martlet
 Southern Metal Martlet

Southern 
(Southern Commercial Airmotive Corp, Dothan, AL)
 Southern 1950 Biplane

Southern 
(Southern Aircraft Div, Portable Products Corp (pres: Willis C Brown), Garland and Greenville, TX)
 Southern Aerocar
 Southern BM-10
 Southern BM-11
 Southernaire
 Southernaire Model II
 Southern XC-1

Southern Aircraft 
(Fleet Southern Aircraft Inc, Travis Field, Savannah, GA)
 Southern Fleet Super-V

Southern Crane 
(Manncraft Airplane Co (pres: H W Mann), Collierville (Memphis), TN)
 Southern Crane 1929 Monoplane

Southern Cross 
 Southern Cross Aviation SC-1

Southern Eagle 
(Southern Eagles Avn Club, Baltimore, MD)
 Southern Eagle A

Southern Pacific 
(Southern Pacific Aircraft corp, Santa Monica, CA)
 Southern Pacific Dragonfly

Southern Powered Parachutes
(Nicholson, GA), (formerly called Condor Powered Parachutes)
Southern Condor
Southern Raptor

Southern Skies
(Southern Skies, LLC, Taylorsville, North Carolina, United States)
Southern Skies Spymotor
Southern Skies Quattro

Sowers-Haugsted 
(Marcellus Sowers & C Haugsted, Nevada, IA)
 Sowers-Haugsted Sportplane

Southwest Research Institute 
 Southwest Research Institute HiSentinel 80

Soyer-Barritault
 Soyer-Barritault SB1

References

Further reading

External links

 List Of Aircraft (S)

de:Liste von Flugzeugtypen/N–S
fr:Liste des aéronefs (N-S)
nl:Lijst van vliegtuigtypes (N-S)
pt:Anexo:Lista de aviões (N-S)
ru:Список самолётов (N-S)
sv:Lista över flygplan/N-S
vi:Danh sách máy bay (N-S)